Fremont School, also known as Freemont School, is a historic elementary school building located in Spartanburg, Spartanburg County, South Carolina.  It was built in 1915, and is a two-story, brick Classical Revival style building with a partially raised basement, and a major addition built in 1926.  It features decorative brickwork, terra cotta ornamentation, and entrance porticoes. The building housed an elementary school from 1915 to 1979.

It was listed on the National Register of Historic Places in 2000.

References

School buildings on the National Register of Historic Places in South Carolina
School buildings completed in 1915
Buildings and structures in Spartanburg, South Carolina
National Register of Historic Places in Spartanburg, South Carolina
1915 establishments in South Carolina